Albert Dinan (27 March 1902 – 3 July 1976) was a French film actor. He appeared in more than ninety films and television series during his career.

Selected filmography

 Bric à Brac et compagnie (1932) - Jean Verly
 Lunegarde (1946)
 120, rue de la Gare (1946) - Bébert
 The Fugitive (1947) - Mac Gregg
 Les aventures de Casanova (1947) - Esprit Jasmin
 Un flic (1947) - Bouthillon
 Le diamant de cent sous (1948) - Jim
 The Murdered Model (1948) - Didier
 Colonel Durand (1948) - Raffart
 Cité de l'espérance (1948) - M. Victor
 The Cupboard Was Bare (1948) - P'tit Louis
 Scandale (1948) - Jeff
 L'homme aux mains d'argile (1949) - Buck
 The Red Angel (1949) - Max
 Dernière heure, édition spéciale (1949) - L'inspecteur Perrier
 Drame au Vel'd'Hiv''' (1949) - Trois Pattes
 La voyageuse inattendue (1950) - Dudule
 Sending of Flowers (1950) - Rodolphe Salis
 Pigalle-Saint-Germain-des-Prés (1950) - Monsieur Jo
 Le traqué (1950) - Gaston
 Fugitive from Montreal (1950) - Le marchand de journaux
 Street Without a King (1950) - François
 Gunman in the Streets (1950) - Gaston
 Four in a Jeep (1951) - Sgt. Marcel Pasture
 Domenica (1952) - Carlo
 My Wife, My Cow and Me (1952)
 Sergil Amongst the Girls (1952) - L'adjoint
 Procès au Vatican (1952) - Pranzini
 Rayés des vivants (1952) - Toto
 Je suis un mouchard (1953) - Petit-Jules
 Innocents in Paris (1953) - Louvre Doorman
 La vierge du Rhin (1953) - Le commissaire Guérin
 Alarm in Morocco (1953) - Roland
 J'y suis... j'y reste (1953) - Jules
 Crime au Concert Mayol (1954)
 The Infiltrator (1955) - Mariani
 Caroline and the Rebels (1955) - Lieutenant Guéneau
 La villa Sans-Souci (1955) - Le commissaire
 Les nuits de Montmartre (1955) - Francis
 Je suis un sentimental (1955) - Henri
 Gas-Oil (1955) - Émile Serin
 Mémoires d'un flic (1956) - Pino - le patron du Marabout
 Le secret de soeur Angèle (1956) - L'inspecteur de Marseille
 Zaza (1956) - Malardot
 Alerte au deuxième bureau (1956)
 Reproduction interdite (1957) - Le boucher
 The Man in the Raincoat (1957) - Le peintre
 Speaking of Murder (1957) - L'inspecteur Pluvier
 Sénéchal the Magnificent (1957) - Léon Duchêne aka M. Léon
 L'inspecteur aime la bagarre (1957) - Raty
 Deuxième bureau contre inconnu (1957) - Georio
 Vacances explosives! (1957) - Le brigadier
 Échec au porteur (1958) - Aldo
 Sinners of Paris (1958) - Emile, un bistrot indicateur
 La fille de feu (1958) - Captain Le Guen
 The Law Is the Law (1958) - Le brigadier-chef des douanes
 Why Women Sin (1958) - Lefébure - le père de Betty
 Ramuntcho (1959) - Baptistin
 Archimède le clochard (1959) - Le restaurateur
 La bête à l'affût (1959) - Yves Le Guen
 Pêcheur d'Islande (1959) - Quémeneur
 Soupe au lait (1959) - L'ami de Roland
 An Angel on Wheels (1959)
 Rue des prairies (1959) - Le barman de Montfort l'Amaury
 À pleines mains (1960) - Bob
 Les Bonnes Femmes (1960) - Albert
 Tomorrow Is My Turn (1960) - Le milicien Cadix
 Wise Guys (1961) - Albert, un ecclésiastique
 L'imprevisto (1961)
 Daniella by Night (1961)
 Le cave se rebiffe (1961) -Le commissaire Rémy
 Secret File 1413 (1961) - Un inspecteur
 Première brigade criminelle (Dossier Interpol M.A.T. 444) (1962) - Un Inspecteur de Police
 Douce violence (1962) - Popoff
 Gigot (1962) - Bistro Proprietor
 The Gentleman from Epsom (1962) - Léon
 Jeff Gordon, Secret Agent (1963) - L'indicateur (uncredited)
 The Trip to Biarritz (1963) - Bastide
 Les femmes d'abord (1963) - Clémenti
 Carom Shots (1963) - Un homme (uncredited)
 The Bread Peddler (1963) - Le Tourangeau, un boulanger
 Anatomy of a Marriage (1964)
 Le bluffeur (1964) - Henri
 Coplan Takes Risks (1964)
 Requiem pour un caïd (1964) - Inspecteur Picard
 L'homme à la Buick (1968) - Le plombier

References

Bibliography
 Goble, Alan. The Complete Index to Literary Sources in Film''. Walter de Gruyter, 1999.

External links

1902 births
1976 deaths
French male film actors
20th-century French male actors
Male actors from Paris